Lipetsk Airport  is an airport in Lipetsk Oblast, Russia located 12 km north of Lipetsk.  It is a smaller airfield north of city near Lipetsk Air Base.  It handles small airliner traffic.

Airlines and destinations

References

External links
 Lipetsk Airport Official Site

Airports built in the Soviet Union
Airports in Lipetsk Oblast